St. Andrew's Junior College (SAJC) is a junior college in Singapore, offering two-year pre-university courses leading up to the Singapore-Cambridge GCE Advanced Level examination. It is an Anglican mission school, part of St. Andrew's School. It is affiliated to schools under the Anglican Diocese of Singapore, as well as Presbyterian High School.

History
St. Andrew's Junior College (SAJC) has its origins in St. Andrew's School, which was founded in 1862 by the Anglican Diocese of Singapore. SAJC is an aided mission school which was started as a vision of faith when the Anglican Church took up the challenge of building a junior college in line with national educational developments in the 1970s. The Lutheran and Presbyterian Churches also joined in the building project. SAJC had its origins as pre-university classes began in 1969 as part of Saint Andrew's Secondary School. In 1978, the college was formally established with its own campus at Telok Blangah, where it remained for 28 years.

At the former campus at Malan Road, the junior college had an air conditioned hall. Initially tutorial rooms were not air-conditioned.  Indeed, some tutorial rooms only had 3 walls, with the fourth side fully opened to a common corridor linking the row of rooms. Later, tutorial rooms were air conditioned. As air conditioning in halls and tutorial rooms was not funded by the Ministry of Education in Singapore, it had to be paid for by funds raised by alumni and the college.

The college campus then had a bitumen track and bleachers at the opposite side to the main building. The campus also housed the old Chapel of the Resurrection, which has since relocated to St. Andrew's Village.

It moved to Potong Pasir to form part of St Andrew's Village on 15 December 2005. The campus is now located at the former Secondary School site at 5 Sorby Adams Drive, Singapore 357691 (previously as 55 Potong Pasir Avenue 1). St Andrew’s Village was officially opened by the then Minister for Education Tharman Shanmugaratnam on 26th Aug 2006. A sheltered pedestrian bridge, named Jacob Ballas Bridge, connects the college to the secondary and junior schools across the Kallang River.

Principals

Affiliations 
Saint Andrew's Junior College is affiliated to the Anglican Diocese of Singapore, as well as all institutions affiliated to the Anglican Diocese of Singapore.

These institutions include Saint Andrew's Junior School, Saint Andrew's Secondary School, Anglican High School, Christ Church Secondary School, Kuo Chuan Presbyterian Secondary School, Presbyterian High School, Saint Hilda's Secondary School and Saint Margaret's Secondary School.

The College is part of and affiliated to other organisations in The Saints' Family.

Identity and Culture 
Students at the college are called "Saints".

Motto 
All the Saint Andrew's Schools shares the same motto, "Up and On", as well as the school colours of blue and white.

Crest 

The former crest of Saint Andrew's Junior College distincted itself from that of SASS and SAJS.  It bore the saltire and had "SAJC" in white letters on a red circle in the middle of the cross instead of the tiger head and crossed keys of the other schools.  The crest was changed in 1993 to that of SASS to forge a united Saint Andrew's identity.

Houses and Classes
There are five houses in SAJC, whose names matches that of SAJS and SASS. They are Romanis, Gomes, Hose, LoyFatt, Venn, all named after founding members of St. Andrew's School. Students in the Faculty of Arts belong to the house Romanis, while students in the Faculty of Science are split among the other houses. Classes, known as Civic Groups (CG) in the college, are named by the year the students came into the school, the faculty (A for Arts, S for Science) and a number. An example is "16S04"  –  meaning, the class started in 2016, is in the Faculty of Science and is the 4th class in the faculty.

Anthem 
The College Anthem differs from that of SAJS and SASS. It is unique in that the key shifted from G-major to F-major midway and back to G-major at the end. Also, the words 'Up Boys' is changed to 'Up Saints', as the college is co-ed. The music was written by J.J. de Souza and the lyrics by Pauline Koe. The College Hymn then was O God, Our Help in Ages Past. The anthem and hymn were changed in 1993 to that of SASS to forge a united Saint Andrew's identity.

Uniform 
Male students wear a white short-sleeved shirt and navy blue long pants, along with a navy blue tie with yellow and white stripes and bearing the school crest. Female students wear a white short-sleeved shirt and navy blue skirt of which the hemline should be no higher than 5 cm from the middle of the knee cap as well as the back of the knee.

The formal attire changes the white shirt or blouse to a long-sleeved one, and the pants or skirts to a white one. Students donning this uniform will wear black court shoes.

The PE attire consists of a white FBT-branded dry-fit shirt with the school crest sewn on the chest. The college divides students into 5 Houses – Venn (black), Loy Fatt (yellow), Hose (blue), Gomes (red) and Romanis (green). Students purchase a shirt with their house colours at the side torso area. The shirt follows the previous shirt designs with the word, "SAINTS", printed on the back of the shirt. The previous shirt was cotton based and house colours were dyed on the sleeves of the shirts instead. The shorts are navy blue shorts with the college initials sewn at the bottom-right of the shorts. The school tie, which was worn by all students, was solid navy blue with one red and one white diagonal stripe across it toward the bottom.

Christian Culture
The school comes under the purview of Anglican Diocese of Singapore, believing that students do not enrol into the school by chance. This serving as a reminder to both students and staff alike that each Saint has a divine purpose and plan set by God. The school also has daily scripture readings and morning prayers conducted by teachers and students. There's also Chapel held fortnightly lead by associates from the Chapel of the Resurrection. Once a year, the school also observes Passion Week, finishing off with Life Concert, a charismatic worship concert held on school grounds which also serves as an evangelical outreach to non-Christian students.

Campus 
The college is located at the Potong Pasir Campus, on the west bank of Kallang River. This campus is linked to the Woodsville Campus on the east bank (where SAJS and SASS is) via the Jacob Ballas Bridge, forming the 13.5 ha St. Andrew's Village. Together, the three schools form St. Andrew's School.

The college has a 1000-seater two-storey Cultural Centre, an indoor sports hall, rooftop tennis courts, a 400m synthetic track as well as a synthetic football/rugby field. An Olympic-sized swimming pool is also located in the Village.

In 2012, a 12-storey hostel was added to the Village, named St Andrew's Hall. The Hall is under the management of the Board of Governors of St Andrew's Junior College (SAJC) and it is also a member of the Anglican Diocese of Singapore.

Academic Information
Saint Andrew's Junior College offers both arts and science streams that leads to the Singapore-Cambridge GCE Advanced Level examination.

Subjects offered by SAJC:

Co-Curricular Activities
Besides attaining academic success, students of Saint Andrew's Junior College also excel in co-curricular activities. Many College sports place in the top 4 positions at national championship competitions.  Performing arts groups also achieve certificates of distinction at the Singapore Youth Festival Competitions, and hold public performances which are well received. In addition, the students make an indelible impact serving members of the communities, both locally and overseas.

Notable alumni
 Michael Palmer – former Member of Parliament for Punggol East Single Member Constituency and Speaker for Parliament.
 Kishore Mahbubani – former President of the UN Security Council and incumbent Dean of the Lee Kuan Yew School of Public Policy.
 Stefanie Sun – Singaporean singer
 JJ Lin – Singaporean singer
 Hong Jun Yang – Singaporean singer
 Annette Lee - Actress, Writer, Singer-Songwriter
 Jasmine Sokko – Singaporean electronic music singer-songwriter and producer
 Anthony Fok - Economics “Super Tutor” and President of the Association of Tutors (Singapore).  Board Director at Association of Persons with Special Needs (APSN)

External links 

 
 Saint Andrew's alumni

See also
 Education in Singapore

References

Junior colleges in Singapore
Educational institutions established in 1969
Educational institutions established in 1978
 
Toa Payoh
1969 establishments in Singapore